Powelliphanta patrickensis is a species of large, carnivorous land snail, a terrestrial pulmonate gastropod mollusc in the family Rhytididae. This species is endemic to the South Island of New Zealand. Formerly, it was considered as a subspecies of Powelliphanta rossiana.

Distribution
This species occurs only on the Denniston-Stockton Plateau on the South Island of New Zealand.

Conservation status
Powelliphanta patrickensis is classified by the New Zealand Department of Conservation as being Nationally Endangered.  The population is threatened by mining, roading, and introduced predators such as thrushes, rats and possums.

See also
 
 List of non-marine molluscs of New Zealand

References

External links
Powelliphanta patrickensis management plan at Solid Energy

endemic fauna of New Zealand
endemic molluscs of New Zealand
gastropods described in 1949
Powelliphanta
taxa named by Arthur William Baden Powell